Christ Church, East Sheen, is an inclusive and welcoming Church of England church on Christ Church Road, East Sheen, in the London Borough of Richmond upon Thames. Part of the Diocese of Southwark the Parish of Mortlake with East Sheen is served by the Mortlake team ministry, with other churches being St Mary’s Mortlake and All Saints East Sheen.   Christ Church is open daily.   The church is a place of prayer, music and peace offering a welcome to worship to all.  There is an active music life at the church with a new choral scholarship and choristership programme launched in January 2023, and a concert series 

An early work of the architect Arthur Blomfield, the church building, which is in stone, was erected between 1862 and 1864 and extended in 1887. It was built on farmland at the entrance of East Sheen Common. It was originally planned to be opened in April 1863; however, the tower collapsed shortly before completion and had to be rebuilt. The church was finally completed and consecrated nine months later, on 13 January 1864.  The building is Grade II listed,  as are the wrought iron railings around the building to the south and west. 

Mortlake Quiet Gardens are based around the landscaped churchyard and are affiliated to The Quiet Garden Trust.

References

External links
 Official website
 Listing on Southwark Diocese website

1864 establishments in England
19th-century Church of England church buildings
East Sheen
Arthur Blomfield church buildings
East Sheen
Churches completed in 1887
East Sheen
Gardens in religion
Grade II listed churches in the London Borough of Richmond upon Thames